"Fashion Is My Kryptonite" is a song by American singers Bella Thorne and Zendaya, from extended play (EP) Made in Japan. It was released as single on iTunes on July 20, 2012.

Live performances
The song was performed during the double episode of Shake It Up, also named "Made in Japan". The performances reached 4.5 million views. Thorne and Zendaya performed in Disney Channel's special television Make Your Mark. Zendaya performed this song without Thorne in her 16th birthday party. She also included the song in the setlist of her debut tour, Swag It Out Tour.

Commercial reception
"Fashion is My Kryptonite" peaked at number two on Billboard Kid Digital Songs.

Music video
The video was directed by Marc Klasfeld. The music video for this song, which features Cat Deeley, was released August 3, 2012 on the Disney Channel during Toy Story 3. Hours later it appeared on the official Disney Music VEVO account on YouTube.

Awards and nominations

Chart performance

Release history

References

2012 singles
2012 songs
Bella Thorne songs
Music videos directed by Marc Klasfeld
Zendaya songs
Walt Disney Records singles